The Holy Spirit Cathedral or simply Cathedral of Kpalimé, is a religious building located in the town of Kpalimé (also written Palimé) in the southern part of the African country of Togo.

The cathedral follows the Roman or Latin rite and serves as the seat of the Diocese of Kpalimé (Dioecesis Kpalimensis; Diocèse de Kpalimé) which was created in 1994 by the bull "Supremo in Ecclesia" by Pope John Paul II.

History
The cathedral has its origins in the main station and the Holy Spirit parish founded in 1902 by Monsignor Hermann Bücking SVD, in the time when Togo was a possession of the German Empire. The first stone of the present cathedral was laid by German missionaries in 1913 and was blessed in 1914. It was restored in 2001 and was consecrated as a cathedral in 2003.

See also
Roman Catholicism in Togo
Holy Spirit Cathedral

References

Roman Catholic cathedrals in Togo
Kpalimé
Roman Catholic churches completed in 1914
20th-century Roman Catholic church buildings